The 1804 United States presidential election in South Carolina took place between November 2 and December 5, 1804, as part of the 1804 United States presidential election. The state legislature chose 10 representatives, or electors to the Electoral College, who voted for President and Vice President.

During this election, South Carolina cast 10 electoral votes for Democratic Republican incumbent Thomas Jefferson.

References

South Carolina
1804
1804 South Carolina elections